Rockdale is an unincorporated community in Boyd County, Kentucky, United States, located south of Ashland. It is located on Midland Trail (original U.S. Route 60) at its intersection of Kentucky Route 538 and corridor into the city of Ashland. It was mostly a rural area until the 1970s, when a large subdivision began development, with several hundred tract houses.

Rockdale is a part of the Huntington-Ashland Metropolitan Statistical Area (MSA). As of the 2010 census, the MSA had a population of 287,702. New definitions from February 28, 2013, placed the population at 363,000.

Education 
Boyd County Public Schools

References

External links
Chamber of Commerce

Unincorporated communities in Boyd County, Kentucky
Unincorporated communities in Kentucky